Patricia Jean "Pat" Farrar (August 13, 1931 – October 31, 2015) was an American educator. She was the First Lady of South Dakota from 1969 to 1971 during the administration of her husband, former Governor Frank Farrar. She was also on the board of advisers of the John F. Kennedy Center for the Performing Arts. Patricia Farrar won a gold medal at the National Senior Games, also known as the Senior Olympics, in 1989.

Early life and education
Farrar was born Patricia Henley on August 13, 1931, in Britton, South Dakota, to Percy Denis and Margaret (née Schneider) Henley. She was raised in nearby Claremont, where she graduated as valedictorian from Claremont High School in 1949.

She graduated cum laude from the University of South Dakota in 1953, where she studied English and art. Henley placed first runner up in the Miss South Dakota pageant while in college. She began her career as a teacher at Summit High School in Summit, South Dakota.

Career
Farrar was the First Lady of South Dakota from 1969 to 1971. She was also a member of the South Dakota Commission on the Status of Women, as well as the South Dakota State University's advisory board for apparel and textiles. Nationally, Farrar held a seat on the board of advisers for the John F. Kennedy Center for the Performing Arts in Washington, D.C. She wrote and performed a chautauqua based on the life of South Dakota's first First Lady, Margaret Mellette.

In 1989, Farrar won a gold medal in race walking at the second National Senior Games in St. Louis, Missouri.

Death
Farrar died from Lewy body dementia and Parkinson’s disease at Avera St. Luke's Hospital in Aberdeen, South Dakota, on October 31, 2015, at the age of 84. She was survived by her husband and their five children. Governor Dennis Daugaard ordered flags to be flown at half-staff on November 7, 2015, in her honor.

Personal life
Henley married her husband, Frank Farrar, whom she had met at the University of South Dakota, on June 5, 1953, at Fort Benning, Georgia, where he was stationed in the U.S. Army at the time. They had five children, Jeanne, Sally, Robert, Mary and Anne.

References

External links

1931 births
2015 deaths
First Ladies and Gentlemen of South Dakota
Educators from South Dakota
American women educators
Senior Olympic competitors
American female racewalkers
University of South Dakota alumni
People from Brown County, South Dakota
People from Britton, South Dakota
South Dakota Republicans
21st-century American women